The Teacher is a 2022 Indian Malayalam-language drama thriller film directed by Vivek who also wrote the story for the film. Produced by Nutmeg Productions and VTV Films, it stars Amala Paul in the titular role alongside Hakkim Shah, Chemban Vinod Jose and Manju Pillai. The film has music composed by Dawn Vincent.

This film marks the return of Amala Paul to Malayalam cinema after 5 years. It also marks the second directorial of Vivek after Athiran.

The Teacher was released theatrically on 2 December 2022.

Plot
Devika wakes up from her sleep and appears confused. She checks for body injuries and also finds that her ear ring is missing. She is not able to remember what happened the day before. She is a school teacher in charge of athletics and her colleague assures her that she is just tired because the school was having sports meet for the last 4 days. Her husband Sujith is a male nurse and together they have been trying for a baby for a long time.

Devika finds out that she is pregnant. But she is still in the trauma because she was raped by some college kids during the last school meet. She hides that information from her husband. She looked for CCTV footages of what happened but the cameras were not working during that time. She searches porn sites too for videos but did not find any. As the last step, she visits one of the students home and cleverly keeps phone in recording mode in his car. From the conversations he has with his friends, Devika understands that they still have video evidence with them.

Sujith gets to know that Devika is pregnant from the lab report. He visits her doctor and doctor asks him why are they doing abortion. Sujith confronts Devika and Devika admits that she was raped. Sujith gets angry that the kid might be one of the rapists and he does not want to father them. Devika wants to file a police complaint, but Sujith discourages saying the family name will be spoiled.

Sujith's mom Kalyani, a veteran comrade, gives her courage to take revenge on the kids. Devika goes in search of them and finds the leader of the guy working in a food delivery service in Kochi. Kalyani recommends a police informant to her and that he will help her. Devika meets the student and pretends that she is sexually interested in him. He invites Devika to a Hotel in a remote place. There she finds all the kids in the room who although deletes the video and destroys the memory card, insults and abuses her and says they don't want to see her again. Devika then closes the door and reveals that she is trained in martial arts and beats up all the kids with the help of her friend. They attach mock bombs to the kids and scare them to death but leaves them alive. Finally, she revels to Sujith that she does not need him in his life but she will keep the baby.

Cast

Music

The music of the film is composed by Dawn Vincent. The first single titled "Kayalum Kandalum" was released in YouTube on 25 November 2022 while the second single, titled "Oruval", was released on 1 December 2022. The third single "Mazhaidara Vaanundu" was released on 7 December 2022.

Release

Theatrical
The Teacher was released in theatres on 2 December 2022.

Home media
The streaming rights of the film were bought by Netflix and started streaming on 23 December 2022.

Reception
Sajin Shrijith of The New Indian Express gave the film 3 out of 5 and wrote "When one considers the better-written and staged, albeit more violent, examples of films in the same genre in international cinema, one is bound to find the writing in The Teacher slightly lacking." Anjana George of The Times of India gave the film 2.5 out of 5 and wrote "The Teacher is an old wine in a new bottle where we see an uber masculine vengeful woman who embraces brutality to find solace with the support of a man, which itself is sexist. The trauma of a rape is much more than the revenge and such films do nothing but normalise the physical, emotional distress one go through."

References

External links
 

2020s Malayalam-language films
2022 thriller drama films